A day's journey in pre-modern literature, including the Bible, ancient geographers and ethnographers such as Herodotus, is a measurement of distance.

Porter notes that a mule can travel about 3 miles per hour, covering 24 miles in an eight-hour day.

In translation by J.B. Bury (Priscus, fr. 8 in Fragmenta Historicorum Graecorum) 
We set out with the barbarians, and arrived at Sardica, which is thirteen days for a fast traveller from Constantinople. From Constantinople-Istanbul to Sofia is 550–720 km distance at a pace between 42 and 55 km /day.

Based on a comprehensive review of references in Herodotus, Geus  concludes that "Herodotus has a very well-defined notion of what distance a traveller can cover under normal circumstances in a day (between 150 and 200 stades or roughly, between 27 and 40 kilometres)," though he cites some exceptional examples of over 100 km per day.

Notes

Units of length
Biblical phrases